Inside Amy Schumer is an American sketch comedy television series created and hosted by Amy Schumer. The series aired on Comedy Central from April 30, 2013, to June 16, 2016, and was revived in 2022 for a new season on Paramount+. Schumer and Daniel Powell serve as the show's executive producers. The show received a Peabody Award and has been nominated for eight Primetime Emmy Awards, winning two.

Inside Amy Schumer completed its second season on June 3, 2014, and was renewed for a third season a week later. The third season premiered on April 21, 2015, with a fourth season ordered the same day, which premiered one year later on April 21, 2016. On January 6, 2016, the show was renewed for a fifth season. In August 2016, there was speculation though that the show had been cancelled despite the earlier announcement of renewal. Schumer denied the reports via social media, stating that production of the show was going on hiatus while she focused on touring. However, she also stated that she was "not making the show anymore". According to a March 2019 interview by The New York Times, Schumer was under contract to produce another season of the show, leading to its eventual return.

On February 24, 2021, it was announced that the show would be revived with five specials by Paramount+. On September 20, 2022, it was reported that the five installments were no longer called specials but instead would be the five episodes of the fifth season: two episodes debuting on October 20, with the rest releasing weekly. The episodes will air on Comedy Central in the future.

Structure
Each episode is divided into several segments of varying length – sketches, short excerpts of stand-up comedy and street interviews with members of the public. The vast majority of episodes finish with an interview of an unusual person, often regarding sexuality or gender roles. Amy Schumer is the only person featured in every episode and each segment. For its fifth season, the show scrapped all stand-up and interview segments, and added partly animated musical numbers.

Guest stars

Episodes

Season 1 (2013)

Season 2 (2014)

Season 3 (2015)

Season 4 (2016)

Season 5 (2022)

Reception

The show has been met with generally positive reviews. The first season received a weighted average score of 66 out of 100 on Metacritic based on eight critics, indicating "generally favorable reviews". Critics were even more positive towards the second and third seasons, which received Metascores of 74 and 71 respectively. The third season also received a 100% approval rating on Rotten Tomatoes based on reviews from 10 critics, with an average rating of 10 out of 10. The site's critical consensus states, "Edgy and thought-provoking, Inside Amy Schumer'''s third season delivers more of the social relevance and self-deprecating wit that fans of the series have come to expect." The series was honored with a Peabody Award in 2015. The fourth season of the series received a score of 62 on Metacritic.

International broadcast
In 2014, Inside Amy Schumer'' began to be broadcast in Australia by the ABC until 2020; later, it moved to 10 Shake. In the United Kingdom and Ireland, it is broadcast on Viacom networks, primarily Comedy Central, Comedy Central Extra and VH1.

Accolades

References

External links

2010s American sex comedy television series
2010s American sketch comedy television series
2013 American television series debuts
2016 American television series endings
2020s American sex comedy television series
2020s American sketch comedy television series
2022 American television series debuts
American television series revived after cancellation
Comedy Central original programming
English-language television shows
Paramount+ original programming
Peabody Award-winning television programs
Primetime Emmy Award for Outstanding Variety Series winners
Primetime Emmy Award-winning television series
Works by Amy Schumer